Imperium is a Spanish historical fiction television series set in Rome in the 2nd century BC. It is a spin-off of Hispania, la leyenda.

Cast
Lluís Homar - Servius Sulpicius Galba
José Sancho - Quintus Servilius Caepio
Nathalie Poza - Claudia Fabia Mara
Jesús Olmedo - Marco
Aura Garrido - Cora
Antonio Mourelos - Octavio
Belén Fabra - Cordelia
Fernando Andina - Druso

References

External links 

2012 Spanish television series debuts
2012 Spanish television series endings
Television series set in ancient history
2010s Spanish drama television series
Antena 3 (Spanish TV channel) network series
Television spin-offs
Television series set in the 2nd century BC
Television series by Bambú Producciones